Southern Oregon is a region of the U.S. state of Oregon south of Lane County and generally west of the Cascade Range, excluding the southern Oregon Coast. Counties include Douglas, Jackson, Klamath, and Josephine. It includes the Southern Oregon American Viticultural Area, which consists of the Umpqua and Rogue River drainages. As of 2015, the population in the four counties is about 471,000, and in the greater, seven-county definition, it is about 564,000.

Counties
Always included:
 Jackson County: population 212,567
 Douglas County: population 107,685
 Josephine County: population 84,745
 Klamath County: population 66,016
Total population: 471,013

Sometimes included:
 Coos County: population 63,121
 Curry County: population 22,483
 Lake County: population 7,829
Total seven-county population: 564,446

Cities

Politics

Southern Oregon generally supports candidates of the Republican Party in both state and federal elections, but some liberal outliers such as Ashland and Port Orford mean Democrats are usually able to win larger shares of the vote in this region compared to Eastern Oregon. Other than Jackson County, which is considered a swing county, no Democrat has won any county of Southern Oregon in presidential elections since 1996 using the seven-county definition, or since 1964 using the four-county definition. Josephine County has not supported a Democrat for president since 1936.

See also

Southern Oregon Land Conservancy
Southeastern Oregon

References

 

Regions of Oregon